Catherine of Hungary may refer to:

Catherine of Hungary, Queen of Serbia
Catherine of Hungary, Duchess of Świdnica
Catherine of Hungary, heiress presumptive to the thrones of Hungary and Poland